Gillamaire Dall Ua Conallta, Irish poet and Chief Ollam of Ireland, died 1166.

Biography
His obit is given in the Annals of the Four Masters as follows- "M1166.18 The blind Ua Conallta, i.e. Gillamaire, royal poet of Ireland, died; he was of the tribe of Ui-Briuin."

External links
http://www.ucc.ie/celt/published/T100005B/index.html

People from County Roscommon
People from County Galway
Medieval Irish poets
12th-century Irish poets
12th-century Irish writers
1166 deaths
Year of birth unknown
Irish male poets
Irish-language writers